KXES-LP is a Variety formatted broadcast radio station licensed to Galena, Alaska, serving Metro Galena. KXES is owned and operated by Yukon Wireless, Inc.

References

External links

2005 establishments in Alaska
Buildings and structures in Yukon–Koyukuk Census Area, Alaska
XES-LP
Radio stations established in 2005
Variety radio stations in the United States